was a professional Go player.

Biography
Masaki Hoshino became a professional in 1985. He reached 8 dan in 1999.

Promotion record

References

External links
 Nihon Ki-in profile 

1967 births
2019 deaths
Japanese Go players
People from Chiba (city)